Rachel Cargle is an African-American activist, public speaker, and author.

Early life
Cargle was raised in Green, Ohio by her mother, who has polio. Her father died when she was young. Cargle and her mother lived in Section 8 housing in a wealthy suburb, which she stated made her aware of economic differences between herself and her white peers.

She attended the University of Toledo for two years, studying anthropology and sociology before moving to Washington, D.C. at the age of 23. Cargle later shortly attended Columbia University before dropping out without graduating, following an April 2019 incident in which a black male student was followed by university police after declining to present his student identification upon request.

Career
In 2017, a photo of Cargle and her friend holding signs at the Women's March went viral; Cargle's sign read, "If You Don’t Fight for All Women You Fight for No Women."

Cargle began to learn more about feminist issues, and later spoke at several universities with her popular lecture series titled "Unpacking White Feminism". Cargle has fought to promote Intersectionality in her lectures and work." Layla Saad has stated that Cargle is more willing than some activists to engage in debate and thereby educate her social media followers. Mainly focused on anti-racism activism, Cargle's Instagram account grew from 355,000 to 1.7 million followers in the years since 2016.

After a GoFundMe campaign, Cargle founded the Loveland Foundation, which works to increase access to therapy for Black women and girls. Cargle has criticized what she describes as the commodification of wellness.

In 2019, Cargle was studied at the Brooklyn Institute for Social Research and with Imani Perry of Princeton University. In 2020 she opened a writing center and bookstore in Akron, Ohio called Elizabeth’s Bookshop & Writing Centre. Cargle signed a book deal with Dial Press, although as of 2022 no book has yet been published.

Personal life
Cargle is divorced.

References

21st-century American writers
American feminists
American women writers
Living people
21st-century American women writers
Year of birth missing (living people)
21st-century African-American women writers
21st-century African-American writers